Mani Shankar Aiyar (born 10 April 1941) is an Indian politician and former career civil servant diplomat. He is a member of the Indian National Congress Party.

He represented the Mayiladuthurai constituency of Tamil Nadu in the 10th Lok Sabha, 13th Lok Sabha, and 14th Lok Sabha. He was a nominated member of parliament from Rajya Sabha.

Early life and education
Mani Shankar Aiyar is the son of Vaidyanatha Shankar Aiyar, a chartered accountant, and Bhagyalakshmi Shankar Aiyar. He was born in Laxmi Mansions, Lahore in British India, which as post-Partition refugee property, became house for the family of Saadat Hassan Manto. His older brother is the journalist, Swaminathan Aiyar. He lost his father at age 12 in an air crash.

He attended Welham Boys' School, The Doon School and obtained B.A. in economics from St. Stephen's College, Delhi, University of Delhi. While at Doon, he was an editor of The Doon School Weekly. After the loss of his father, Aiyar's mother had to negotiate with Doon to allow him to continue his studies with reduced fees and in return he taught at the school.

He graduated in economics from Delhi University, and then did a two-year B.A. in Tripos in economics at Trinity Hall, Cambridge at the University of Cambridge which, in the Oxbridge tradition, became an M.A. with the passage of time. He was a member of Trinity Hall. He was also an active member of the Marxist Society in Cambridge. At Cambridge, Aiyar joined student politics and once even tried to win a presidential contest. Rajiv Gandhi, who was his junior both at Doon and Cambridge, supported him in his campaign.

Career

He joined the Indian Foreign Service in 1963 and served as Joint Secretary to Government of India from 1982 to 1983 in Ministry of External Affairs and later as  Joint Secretary at Prime Minister's Office from 1985 to 1989. He resigned from service in 1989 to take up a career in politics and media, entering the Parliament as a Congress MP from Mayiladuthurai in 1991, 1999 and 2004 but was defeated in 1996, 1998, 2009 and 2014. He spent some time in Pakistan posted as a diplomat, serving as India's first consul-general in Karachi from 1978 to 1982.

He is a special invitee to the Congress Working Committee and was a chairman of both the party's political training department and the department of policy planning and coordination. He is also a well-known 
political columnist  and has written several books, including Pakistan Papers and Remembering Rajiv, and has edited a four-volume publication, Rajiv Gandhi's India.

His special interests include grassroots democracy, Indian foreign policy particularly with India's neighbouring countries, and West Asia and nuclear disarmament.

Personal life
He was married on 4 January 1973 to Suneet Vir Singh, a Sikh woman. They have 3 daughters – the eldest, Suranya Aiyar is a lawyer; the second, Yamini Aiyar is a senior research fellow and director of the Accountability Initiative;

Aiyar is the uncle of Vidya Shankar Aiyar, former anchor on Channelnews asia and CNN- IBN.

Controversies

Mani Shankar Aiyer has been a part of many controversies.

In 2000, Aiyar was involved in a public brawl with politician Amar Singh. According to Singh, Aiyar insulted Singh's then party leader Mulayam Singh Yadav and remarked: "Oh that bloody Mulayam – he looks just like me. It could be because my father visited Uttar Pradesh at some point. Why don't you check with Mulayam's mother?"

While on a tour of the Andamans as the Cabinet Minister in the later part of 2004, Aiyar was quoted as saying at the Cellular Jail there that there was no difference between the radical right-wing revolutionary Veer Savarkar, a famous inmate of the prison, and Mohammed Ali Jinnah, the founder of Pakistan, as they shared a 'divisive' philosophy. He also ordered that a plaque with a poem commemorating Savarkar be replaced with a plaque with quotes from Mahatma Gandhi. Reports of the incident paralysed Parliament and led to agitations by the Shiv Sena in Maharashtra. Aiyar's remarks created confusion as well in the ruling party; the official spokesman, Anand Sharma, noted that the Congress Party did not consider Savarkar either a freedom fighter or a patriot. A few days later, the Prime Minister dissociated himself and the cabinet from that view.

As sports minister, he effectively scuttled India's bid for Asian Games in 2007. It was widely felt that Delhi's lack of enthusiasm to host the event was the primary reason for its loss. Then Union Sports Minister of India, Mani Shankar Aiyar, spoke strongly against Delhi hosting the games and argued that it was better if the money allocated by India's government for organising the sporting event was spent on building facilities for the poor. The Indian Olympic Association (IOA) president revealed that India's Sports Minister remarks against hosting the Games was the main reason for New Delhi's loss.

In September 2011, Aiyar visited his alma mater—St. Stephen's College—to speak about 'Governance and Corruption: Is Panchayati Raj A Solution?'. However, he began to mock the Hansraj College and its former student Ajay Maken. He also belittled the Kirori Mal College and the BA (Programme) Degree, a course in the University of Delhi. This led to an agitation by the students of Hansraj College. When the agitated students approached him, he mocked them even further. When later questioned by the media, Aiyar refused to apologise and rather ridiculed the institutions even further. Baffled by his remarks, Stephen's College and its students went on to apologise to Hansraj College and extended a hand of friendship.

In the Rajya Sabha in August 2013, Samajwadi Party MP Naresh Agarwal accused Aiyar of being a Pakistani spy, when he refused to discuss the recent murder of 5 Indian soldiers by the Pakistani Army and instead suggested discussing rising gas prices. Aiyar reacted sharply and tried to assault Agarwal.

He in an interview days before the run up to the 2014 Parliament elections in India, said that a tea seller (The Prime Ministerial candidate Narendra Modi of the BJP) can never become the Prime Minister of India, but can sell tea in AICC meetings. His comment was disowned by the congress saying it's his personal view and not the party's view. Rahul Gandhi asked him not to make personal attacks.

In 2015, there was widespread demand for sedition charges against Aiyar for an interview with Dawn News while visiting Pakistan. Aiyar is said to have suggested that Pakistan remove Prime Minister Narendra Modi from power, to be able to continue peace talks between India and Pakistan. On 16 February 2018, Ashok Choudhary, the head of BJP's Kota district OBC wing filed a sedition and defamation case against Aiyer.

Mani Shankar Aiyer justified November 2015 Paris attacks as a response to France banning Hijab. He also justified Charlie Hebdo shooting as a backlash for the death of Muslims. His comments were disapproved by his own party members.

He sparked a political firestorm when he called Prime Minister Narendra Modi a "neech aadmi", which PM Modi interpreted as nichli jaati (lower caste). Subsequently, he was suspended from the party's primary membership. Aiyar said the comments by the PM showed his "low-level mindset and one bereft of any manners". "Mujhko lagta hai ki ye aadmi bahut neech kisam ka aadmi hai, isme koi sabhyata nahi hai. Aise mauke par is kisam ki gandi rajniti karne ki kya avashyakta hai? (This shows the low-level mindset of the PM and one bereft of any manners. What is the need of doing such dirty politics on such an occasion)," ANI quoted Aiyar as saying. Due to this comment the Congress party suspended his primary party membership. After his suspension, he justified his derogatory remarks by adding "My Hindi is not very good. Yes, I called Modi 'neech' but did not mean it as a low-born; I meant it as low,". He has a history of controversial statements against the former PM Atal Bihari Vajpayee. However his suspension has been revoked by Congress President Mr. Rahul Gandhi on 18 August 2018.

In 2019, when asked by an Indian journalist about the "neech aadmi" jibe, Aiyar angrily charged towards the journalist, shook his fist towards him, and remarked: "I will hit you... Just f**k off!"

Publications

Aiyar has written seven books –
 How To Be A Sycophant, NBS, New Delhi, 1990.
 Rajiv Gandhi: The Great Computer Scientist of India, Mughal Publishers, New Delhi, 1991.
 Remembering Rajiv, Rupa & Co., New Delhi, 1992.
 One Year in Parliament, Konark, New Delhi, 1993.
 Pakistan Papers, UBSPD, New Delhi, 1994.
 Knickerwallahs, Silly-Billies and Other Curious Creatures, UBS Publishers, 1995.
 Rajiv Gandhi's India, 4 vols. (General Editor), UBSPD New Delhi, 1997.
 Confessions of a Secular Fundamentalist, Penguin, 2004.
 A Time of Transition: Rajiv Gandhi to the 21st Century, Penguin, 2009.

References

Further reading

External links

Biography at Indian Sports Ministry website
Article in The Economic Times about him dated 23 May 2004.
Information as a member of 14th Lok Sabha on website of Lok Sabha
Quote on cnn.com
Speech to business leaders on poverty and growth
Mani Shankar Aiyer Statement Regarding Terrorism
 Official biographical sketch in Parliament of India website

1941 births
Alumni of Trinity Hall, Cambridge
Alumni of the University of Cambridge
Living people
Indian atheists
Indian expatriates in Pakistan
The Doon School alumni
India MPs 1999–2004
India MPs 2004–2009
Union Ministers from Tamil Nadu
Politicians from Lahore
Nominated members of the Rajya Sabha
India MPs 1991–1996
Lok Sabha members from Tamil Nadu
United Progressive Alliance candidates in the 2014 Indian general election
Indian civil servants
Indian government officials
Indian Foreign Service officers
People from Mayiladuthurai district
Petroleum and Natural Gas Ministers of India
Members of the Cabinet of India